Oleg Arkadyevich Shalayev (born 6 February 1992) is a Russian professional footballеr who plays as a midfielder for Novosibirsk.

Career
Shalayev made his professional debut for Spartak Nalchik on 13 July 2010 in the Russian Cup game against Volga Nizhny Novgorod.

He made his Russian Football National League debut for FC Yenisey Krasnoyarsk on 6 May 2013 in a game against FC Ufa.

References

External links
 

1992 births
Footballers from Saint Petersburg
Living people
Russian footballers
Association football midfielders
Russia youth international footballers
Russia under-21 international footballers
PFC Spartak Nalchik players
PFC Slavia Sofia players
FC Haskovo players
FC Volgar Astrakhan players
PFC Krylia Sovetov Samara players
FC Tom Tomsk players
FC Yenisey Krasnoyarsk players
FC Urozhay Krasnodar players
Russian First League players
Russian Second League players
First Professional Football League (Bulgaria) players
Russian expatriate footballers
Expatriate footballers in Bulgaria
Russian expatriate sportspeople in Bulgaria